Caledon Nature Reserve is situated 120 km south-east of Bloemfontein on the R701 road between Wepener and Smithfield in the Free State, South Africa. It is about 2,300 hectares in size. 

The park is named after, and situated on the Caledon River, which is dammed at Welbedacht Dam close to the Lesotho border. This dam supplies Bloemfontein with water, the nature reserve is located on the western shore of the reservoir. Wepener (also close to the border) is its closest town.

In addition to the wide variety of birds (over 200 species, most of which are waterfowl) it is home to the Black wildebeest, Gemsbok, Impala, Blesbok, Red hartebeest, Springbok and Zebra.

Two floating bush camps on rafts offer overnight accommodation for hikers and canoeists. On the shore there are huts for self-catering and a lapa with braai facilities. Fishing is the main attraction here, in the river and dam there are Barbel, Yellowfish and Carp.

Mammals in the reserve

See also
 Caledon Nature Reserve, Motheo, Free State
 Free State Tourism Authority - Wepener

Nature reserves in South Africa
Protected areas of the Free State (province)